Róża Kozakowska (born 26 August 1989) is a Polish Paralympic athlete competing in F32-classification events. She won the gold medal in the women's club throw F32 event at the 2020 Summer Paralympics held in Tokyo, Japan. She also set a new world record of 28.74 metres. She won the silver medal in the women's shot put F32 event.

She competed in the women's long jump T38 event at the 2019 World Para Athletics Championships held in Dubai, United Arab Emirates. In June 2021, she won the bronze medal in the women's shot put F32 event at the 2021 World Para Athletics European Championships held in Bydgoszcz, Poland. She came first in the F32 Club throw with the longest throw ever of 28.74m. The Ukrainian Anastasiia Moskalenko took the silver, Mounia Gasmi of Algeria had the bronze and Alia Issa, the first woman to represent the Refugee Paralympic Team, came eighth.

References

External links 
 

Living people
1989 births
People from Zduńska Wola
Female club throwers
Polish female shot putters
Medalists at the World Para Athletics European Championships
Paralympic athletes of Poland
Athletes (track and field) at the 2020 Summer Paralympics
Medalists at the 2020 Summer Paralympics
Paralympic gold medalists for Poland
Paralympic silver medalists for Poland
Paralympic medalists in athletics (track and field)
20th-century Polish women
21st-century Polish women